Lancaster Armory, also known as Brigadier General Charles P. Stahr Armory, is a historic National Guard armory located at Lancaster, Lancaster County, Pennsylvania.  It is a "T"-shaped brick building consisting of a 3-story administration building built in 1937, with a 1 1/2-story drill hall built in 1928, executed in the Colonial Revival style. It measures approximately 90 feet by 200 feet.  The building was firebombed in 1982.  The building once played host to the Lancaster Red Roses.  It was used as a public  venue under the name The Stahr Center.  Is currently the home of decades restaurant bar and arcade. In 2018 it was renovated and now houses Decades, a boutique bowling alley and retro-arcade.

It was added to the National Register of Historic Places in 1991.

References

Armories on the National Register of Historic Places in Pennsylvania
Colonial Revival architecture in Pennsylvania
Government buildings completed in 1937
Buildings and structures in Lancaster, Pennsylvania
National Register of Historic Places in Lancaster, Pennsylvania